The Lycée Pierre-Corneille (also known as the Lycée Corneille) is a state secondary school located in the city of Rouen, France.

Originally founded by the Jesuits in 1593, the school was secularized following the 1905 French law on the Separation of the Churches and the State, and is today non-religious and ruled by the French Ministry of Education.

The school adopted the name of the playwright Pierre Corneille in 1873, and was classified as a national heritage site in December 1985.

Origins

The Protestant Reformation of the 16th century led the Archbishop of Rouen, Charles, Cardinal de Bourbon, to protect the influence of the Catholic Church by creating a school to educate the children of the aristocracy and bourgeoisie in accordance with the purest doctrinal principles of Roman Catholicism. The school started teaching in 1593 run by the Jesuits and known initially as the Collège de Bourbon.

From 1595 to 1604 teaching ceased because of Jesuit expulsions. Between 1614 and 1631 the gatehouse and chapel were built. By 1662, the lycée had taught two thousand pupils.

The chapel was opened in 1631 although foundation stone had been laid in 1614 by Marie de Médicis, the widow of King Henri IV of France. The chapel blends both late gothic and classical architectural styles in its fifty-two metre nave. It became a listed building in 1908.

In 1762 the school became known as the Collège Royal after the Jesuits had been expelled from France.
After the French Revolution it became associated with the 'Ecole Centrale' following the ideas of the Age of Enlightenment, and reducing study of humanities in favour of a broader-based curriculum.

After 1803 it became known as the 'Lycée Impérial' and taught humanities and mathematics following the principles and discipline of the Napoleonic code. Successful students were awarded the Baccalauréat and subjects increased to include languages and Natural Sciences. The school then developed a two-year 'post baccalaureate' curriculum that enabled entry to the Grandes écoles.

In 1873, the Lycée was renamed 'Lycée Pierre-Corneille' in honour of the alumnus, the 17th century writer and academic, Pierre Corneille. At this time the petit lycée was added for younger pupils. In 1890 the sports club Les Francs Joueurs was founded.

Since 1918 the school has run a Norwegian 'college' that houses typically twenty-four boys for three years each. This was developed as an international peace-building initiative after World War I. In 2018, Queen Sonja of Norway visited the school to mark the centenary of the scheme, with Brigitte Macron and Rolf Einar Fife. 

During World War I it served as a military hospital. In World War II it was commandeered by the German army, and was then bombed in September 1942 and on April 19, 1944.

Today it educates students in preparation for university and Grandes écoles.

People

Alumni 

 Jules Adeline, engraver
 Louis Anquetin, painter
 Jean-Jacques Antier, journalist and writer
 , painter
 , businessman
 Jacques-Henri Bernardin de Saint-Pierre
 Antoine Blondin, writer
 , scientist
 Pierre Bourguignon
 Armand Carrel
 René-Robert Cavelier, Sieur de La Salle
 Claude Chappe
 Patrick Chesnais, actor and director
 , biologist
 Pierre Corneille, writer and academic
 Thomas Corneille, writer and academic
 Camille Corot
 
 
 Patrick Dehornoy, mathematician
 Eugène Delacroix, painter
 
  scientist
 
 , journalist
 Marcel Duchamp
 Édouard Dujardin, writer
 Pierre-Louis Dulong scientist
 Pierre Dumont
 Marcel Dupré, organist
 Charles Féré, Doctor of medicine
 Gustave Flaubert, writer
 Bernard Le Bouyer de Fontenelle, writer and academic
 Henri Gadeau de Kerville, naturalist
 , politician
 Pierre Giffard, journalist, editor
 , writer
 Maurice Leblanc, writer
 Jean Lecanuet, politician
 , artist painter
 André Marie, politician
 Émile Masqueray, anthropologist and ethnologist
 Guy de Maupassant, writer
 André Maurois, writer
 Jean-Luc Mélenchon, politician
 , army officer
 Théodore Monod
 , journalist and writer
 Charles Nicolle, doctor physician
 
 , Film director
 Thomas Pesquet, astronaut 2009
 Robert Antoine Pinchon, artist-painter
 Jean Prévost
 , President of UNEF
 Torstein Raaby, Norwegian telegrapher, resistance fighter and explorer.
 
 Jacques Rivette, Director
 Jean Rochefort, actor
 Bertrand Serlet, engineer
 , archeologist
 Karin Viard, actress
 Jacques Villon, artist
 
 Étienne Wolff
 Rachid Yazami

Teachers 

 Théodore Bachelet (1847–1873)
 Léon Brunschvicg (1895–1900)
  (1878–1959)
  (1934–1936)
  (1937–?)
 Émile Chartier
 
 
  (1964–1988)
 Mongo Beti (1966–1994)

See also
 List of Jesuit sites

References

Education in Rouen
Pierre-Corneille
Pierre-Corneille
Pierre-Corneille
1593 establishments in France